Buerak ("Gully") is a post-punk band from Novosibirsk, Russia. It was founded in 2014 by Artyom Cherepanov and Alexandr Makeyev. According to Afisha magazine, Buerak is one of the main groups of the "new Russian wave".

History
Singer Artyom Cherepanov and guitarist Alexandr Makeyev established Buerak in Novosibirsk in 2014.

In 2017, the musicians of the band accused their former tour manager Stepan Kazaryan of fraud.

Discography

Studio albums
 2016 – Танцы По Расчёту
 2017 – Скромные Апартаменты
 2018 – Репост Модерн
 2019 – Шоу-бизнес
 2020 - Компактные откровения
 2021 - Танцы По Расчёту 2
 2022 - Музей устаревшего искусства

Extended plays 
 2014 – Преступность / Крестьянство
 2015 – Пролетариат
 2016 – Корни
 2019 – Готика
 2019 – Китайский Квартал
 2019 - SEND NUDES
 2020 – Среди них ты
 2020 - Не Станет Хитом
 2022 - Акустика
 2023 - Некролог

Singles
 2014 – Портреты
 2014 – Полны любви
 2015 – Двойник
 2015 – Формы
 2015 – Зимние песни
 2016 – Страсть к курению
 2016 – Влюбленный Альфонс
 2017 – Усталость от безделья
 2017 – Летние дворы
 2018 – Друг
 2018 – Собутыльник
 2018 – Бесплатный вход
 2018 – Неважно
 2019 - Дурачок
 2019 - Сотка (В кармане зимней куртки)
 2019 - Боль
 2020 - Лузер блюз
 2021 - На старых сидениях кинотеатра 2
 2021 - Ушёл в себя
 2021 - Там где ты
 2022 - Бесконтактное общение
 2022 - Спортивные очки 2
 2022 - Пульс Стучит

Music videos
 2016 — Шаги
 2017 — Усталость от безделья
 2017 — Упал
 2017 — Страсть к курению
 2017 — Летние дворы
 2017 — Твоя фигура
 2018 — Тупой
 2018 — Нет любви
 2019 — На старых сидениях кинотеатра
 2021 – Очень короткий роман

See also
 Ploho
 Molchat Doma

References

External links
 

Musical groups from Novosibirsk
Russian post-punk music groups
Musical groups established in 2014
2014 establishments in Russia